Labuduwa is a small town in Sri Lanka. It is located within Southern Province.

See also
List of towns in Southern Province, Sri Lanka

External links

Populated places in Southern Province, Sri Lanka
Grama Niladhari divisions of Sri Lanka